Kawczyn (Kawcze-Młyn) is a village in Gmina Miastko, Bytów County, Pomeranian Voivodeship, in northern Poland.

From 1975 to 1998 the village was in Słupsk Voivodeship. 

Kawczyn is located near the Studnica river.

References

Map of the Gmina Miastko

Kawczyn